Canavesio is a surname. Notable people with the surname include:

Giancarlo Canavesio (born 1968), Italian film producer, investment banker, and entrepreneur
Giovanni Canavesio (before 1450–1500), Italian artist
Robertino Canavesio (born 1993), Argentine footballer 

Italian-language surnames